Edirne railway station is the main railway station in Edirne, Turkey. Located in the southeastern part of the city, TCDD Taşımacılık operates two international intercity trains, both from Istanbul, to Sofia, Bulgaria and Bucharest, Romania which stop at the station. Along with these two trains, TCDD Taşımacılık also operates a daily regional train from Kapıkule to Istanbul.

Edirne station was built in 1971 as a replacement to the 1873 station, built by the Oriental Railway.

History
The original railway station in Edirne was built in 1873 by the Oriental Railway (CO) as part of a railway from Istanbul to Vienna.  When the Treaty of Lausanne was signed in 1923, after Turkish War of Independence, the border between Turkey and Greece was placed along the Maritsa river, except for a small portion of land west of Edirne which remained Turkish. This proved problematic for trains heading to Europe via Bulgaria from Turkey and Greece, since trains need to enter Turkey, from Greece, and then exit back into Greece  further in order to continue northwest into Bulgaria.

Part of this new railway line was a new railway station in Edirne. This new station was built in a more central location with a larger station building, built in the Postmodern style. The new station, along with the railway, was opened in August 1971. This led to the closure of Karaağaç station, which was closed to railway traffic on 4 October of the same year.

In 1989, Optima Tours began operating a motorail train service from Edirne to Villach, Austria. The train, named the Optima Express, was the first motorail train service in Turkey.

Edirne station was electrified in 1997, with 25 kV AC, 60 HZ overhead wire.

See also
Van railway station Opened in the same year, with the near-identical station buildings.

References 

Buildings and structures in Edirne
Railway stations in Edirne Province
Railway stations opened in 1971
1971 establishments in Turkey